Senator Dungan may refer to:

James I. Dungan (1844–1931), Ohio State Senate
Warren S. Dungan (1822–1913), Iowa State Senate

See also
Senator Duncan (disambiguation)